Patrick Wakula  is an Anglican bishop in Uganda: he has been Bishop of Central Busoga since 2016.

Wakula was educated at  Makerere University. He was ordained a deacon in 1995 and a priest in 1997.  He served in Kamuli District. Later he was Archdeacon of Kaliro then Jinja. Wakula was consecrated and enthroned as Bishop on 13 November 2016 at All Saints’ Pro-Cathedral, Iganga.

References

21st-century Anglican bishops in Uganda
Anglican bishops of Central Busoga
Makerere University alumni
Year of birth missing (living people)
Living people